Gwynne Herbert (11 September 1859 – 17 February  1946) was a British stage and film actress.

Partial filmography
 Liberty Hall (1914)
 The Christian (1915)
 The Firm of Girdlestone (1915)
 The Folly of Desire (1915)
 The Shulamite (1915)
 Annie Laurie (1916)
 His Daughter's Dilemma (1916)
 Everybody's Business (1917)
 The Manxman (1917)
 A Fortune at Stake (1918)
 Boundary House (1918)
 The Nature of the Beast (1919)
 The Toilers (1919)
 The Kinsman (1919)
The Homemaker (1919)
 Possession (1919)
 The Forest on the Hill (1919)
 Alf's Button (1920)
 Mrs. Erricker's Reputation (1920) 
 Once Aboard the Lugger (1920)
 John Forrest Finds Himself (1920)
 The Lunatic at Large (1921)
 The Narrow Valley (1921)
 Tit for Tat (1921)
 Mr. Justice Raffles (1921)
 The Tinted Venus (1921)
 Dollars in Surrey (1921) (1921)
 Mist in the Valley (1923)
 Strangling Threads (1923)
 The Naked Man (1923)
 The World of Wonderful Reality (1924)

References

External links

1859 births
1946 deaths
English stage actresses
English film actresses
English silent film actresses
Actresses from London
20th-century English actresses